Trachycephalus macrotis, also known as the Amazonian milk frog and known in Spanish as , is a frog in the family Hylidae.  It is endemic to Peru and Ecuador.  Scientists have seen it between 225 and 925 m above sea level.

The adult male frog measures 69.8 to 91.5 mm in snout-vent length and the adult female frog 93.9 to 118.7 mm.  Its head is wider than it is long.  It has bronze-colored skin with coffee-colored marks.  It has some webbing on its feet and relatively small climbing disks on its toes.

This frog engages in explosive breeding after heavy rain.

References

Frogs of South America
Trachycephalus